BRAThANKI is a  Polish folk rock group. They combine Polish, Hungarian and Czech folk elements with rock music.

Discography

References

External links
 Official site

Polish musical groups
Polish folk groups